The Nitsa is a river in the Sverdlovsk Oblast in Russia. It is a tributary of the Tura. The river commences at the confluence of the Neyva and the Rezh, east of the city Alapayevsk and flows firstly in an easterly and then in southeasterly direction. The Nitsa converges with the Tura at Ust-Nitsinskoye.

The river has a mixed supply, which is dominated by snow. The river is usually frozen by the end of October, beginning of November until the end of April. The river is navigable along its entire length. The most important tributary is the Irbit, which joins at the city of the same name.

References 

Rivers of Sverdlovsk Oblast